Enixotrophon tenuirostratus is a species of sea snail, a marine gastropod mollusk in the family Muricidae, the murex snails or rock snails.

Description

Distribution
This marine species occurs off the Andaman and Nicobar Islands.

References

 Marshall B.A. & Houart R. (2011) The genus Pagodula (Mollusca: Gastropoda: Muricidae) in Australia, the New Zealand region and the Tasman Sea. New Zealand Journal of Geology and Geophysics 54(1): 89–114.

External links
 Smith, E. A. (1899). Natural history notes from H.M. Indian Marine Survey Steamer 'Investigator,' Commander T. H. Heming, R.N. — Series III., No. 1. On Mollusca from the Bay of Bengal and the Arabian Sea. Annals and Magazine of Natural History. ser. 7, 4 (22): 237-251
 Barco, A.; Marshall, B.; A. Houart, R.; Oliverio, M. (2015). Molecular phylogenetics of Haustrinae and Pagodulinae (Neogastropoda: Muricidae) with a focus on New Zealand species. Journal of Molluscan Studies. 81(4): 476-488

Gastropods described in 1899
Enixotrophon